Johan Lindgren (born August 13, 1986) is a Swedish  professional road bicycle racer. He was professional for just one season in the ProTour in 2007 for UCI ProTeam , later joining Team Cykelcity for four seasons.

Palmarès 

  U19 Road Race Champion (2004)
 2nd (2003)

External links 

Swedish male cyclists
1986 births
Living people
Place of birth missing (living people)